Ophir is a port or region mentioned in the Bible, famous for its wealth. King Solomon received a shipment from Ophir every three years (1 Kings 10:22) which consisted of gold, silver, sandalwood, pearls, ivory, apes, and peacocks.

Biblical references
Ophir in Genesis 10 (the Table of Nations) is said to be the name of one of the sons of Joktan. The Books of Kings and Chronicles tell of a joint expedition to Ophir by King Solomon and the Tyrian king Hiram I from Ezion-Geber, a port on the Red Sea, that brought back large amounts of gold, precious stones and 'algum wood' and of a later failed expedition by king Jehoshaphat of Judah.  The famous 'gold of Ophir' is referenced in several other books of the Hebrew Bible.

In the Septuagint, other variants of the name are mentioned: Ōpheír, Sōphír, Sōpheír and Souphír.

The New Testament apocrypha book Cave of Treasures contains a passage: "And the children of Ophir, that is, Send, appointed to be their king Lophoron, who built Ophir with stones of gold; now, all the stones that are in Ophir are of gold."

Archaeology and US-Saudi investigation on Mand adh Dhahab
In 1946, an inscribed pottery shard was found at Tell Qasile (in modern-day Tel Aviv), dating to the eighth century BC. It bears, in Paleo-Hebrew script, the text "gold of Ophir to/for Beth-Horon [...] 30 shekels" The find confirms that Ophir was a place from which gold was imported.

In 1976, the United States Department of Interior announced that a team formed by the United States Geological Survey together with experts from Saudi Arabia believes it has "a fairly airtight case” that Mahd adh Dhahab, or Cradle of Gold, in Saudi Arabia is the biblical Ophir. As evidence, the team states that "there are huge quantities of waste rock left behind by ancient miners, approximately a million tons, and that it has an average gold content of sixtenths of an ounce per ton, indicating that the mined ore must have been richer. From sampling old slopes and from production figures during the 1939 to 1954 period when the mine was reactivated to extract gold and silver, the geological survey scientists estimated that in biblical times much gold must have been found at or near the surface." Moreover, Mahd adh Dhahab is "within range of Israel's transport capability," and it "could easily have been known to Solomon or his advisers because it lies on a north‐south trade route that has run to Aqaba for some 4,000 years." Their conclusion is that "Mand adh Dhahab [sic] could have produced 34 tons of gold in ancient times and was the biblical Ophir."

Theorized locations

Possible 1st century BC trade routes

Sri Lanka
The 10th-century lexicographer, David ben Abraham al-Fasi, identified Ophir with Serendip, the old Persian name for Sri Lanka (aka Ceylon). Moreover, as mentioned above, A Dictionary of the Bible by Sir William Smith notes the Hebrew word for parrot Thukki, derived from the Classical Tamil for peacock Thogkai or Sinhalese "tokei". Both Sinhalese and Tamil are native to Sri Lanka.

Poovar, Kerala, India 

A Dictionary of the Bible by Sir William Smith, published in 1863, notes the Hebrew word for parrot Thukki, derived from the Classical Tamil for peacock Thogkai and Sinhalese "tokei", joins other Classical Tamil words for ivory, cotton-cloth and apes preserved in the Hebrew Bible. This theory of Ophir's location in Tamilakam is further supported by other historians. The most likely location on the coast of Kerala conjectured to be Ophir is Poovar in Thiruvananthapuram District (though some Indian scholars also suggest Beypore as a possible location).

Earlier in the 19th century, Max Müller and other scholars identified Ophir with Abhira, near the Indus River in modern-day state of Gujarat, India. According to Benjamin Walker Ophir is said to have been a town of the Abhira tribe.

In Jewish tradition, Ophir is often associated with a place in the Indian subcontinent, named for one of the sons of Joktan. Ibn Sa'd says in his Kitab at-Tabaqat al-Kabir that the Indians, the Sindhis and the Bindis are the descendants of Yufir (Ophir).

Philippines

In Tomo III (1519-1522), pages 112-138, of the book Colección general de documentos relativos a las Islas Filipinas existentes en el Archivo de Indias de Sevilla, found in the General Archive of the Indies in Spain, Document No. 98 describes how to locate the land of Ophir. The navigational guide started from the Cape of Good Hope in Africa to India, to Burma, to Sumatra, to the Maluku Islands, to Borneo, to Sulu, to China, then finally Ophir, which is said to be the Philippines. Parallel to this Spanish archive an older text called the "Periplus of the Erythean Sea" cited the directions to Chryse, a golden island in the Eastern Ocean, is an island right to the south of China, where the Philippines is.

Africa
Biblical scholars, archaeologists and others have tried to determine the exact location of Ophir. Vasco da Gama's companion Tomé Lopes reasoned that Ophir would have been the ancient name for Great Zimbabwe in Zimbabwe, the main center of southern African trade in gold in the Renaissance period — though the ruins at Great Zimbabwe are now dated to the medieval era, long after Solomon is said to have lived. The identification of Ophir with Sofala in Mozambique was mentioned by Milton in Paradise Lost (11:399-401), among many other works of literature and science.

Another, more serious, possibility is the African shore of the Red Sea, with the name perhaps being derived from the Afar people living in the Danakil desert (Ethiopia, Eritrea) between Adulis and Djibouti.

Afri was a Latin name used to refer to the Carthaginians, who dwelt in North Africa, in modern-day Tunisia. This name, that later gave the rich Roman province of Africa and the subsequent medieval Ifriqiya, from which the name of the continent Africa is ultimately derived, seems to have referred to a native Libyan tribe originally, however, see Terence for discussion. The name is usually connected with Phoenician afar, "dust", but a 1981 hypothesis has asserted that it stems from the Berber word ifri (plural ifran) meaning "cave", in reference to cave dwellers. This is proposed to be the origin of Ophir as well.

Inspiration or named after

Americas
In a letter written in May 1500, Peter Martyr claimed that Christopher Columbus identified Hispaniola with Ophir.

The theologian Benito Arias Montano (1571) proposed finding Ophir in the name of Peru, reasoning that the native Peruvians were thus descendants of Ophir and Shem.

The California Gold Rush boomtown, Ophir, was renamed after "the biblical source of Solomon's treasure."

Malaysia
Mount Ophir is the English name of Gunung Ledang in Johor, Malaysia.

Solomon Islands
In 1568, Alvaro Mendaña became the first European to discover the Solomon Islands, and named them as such because he believed them to be Ophir.

See also
 Tarshish, another Biblical location providing Solomon with riches.
 Karl Mauch, an explorer who inadvertently discovered Great Zimbabwe when searching for Ophir.
Land of Punt

Notes

References

Bibliography
 
 
 
 (fr) Quatremère (1861), Mémoire sur le pays d’Ophir, in Mélanges d'histoire, Ducrocq, Paris, p. 234 (read @ Archive).
For many references and a comprehensive outline of the products exported from Muziris, Ariake &c. cf. George Menachery ed. The St. Thomas Christian Encyclopaedia of India, 1973, 1982, 2009.

External links
 Onshore explorations at Sopara and Kalyan, India
 

 
Hebrew Bible places
Book of Genesis people
Lost mines
Books of Kings
Books of Chronicles
Historical regions
Solomon